Heidi Thomas  (born 13 August 1962) is an English screenwriter and playwright.

Career
After reading English at Liverpool University, Thomas gained national attention when her play, Shamrocks And Crocodiles, won the John Whiting Award in 1985. Her play Indigo was performed by the Royal Shakespeare Company in their 1987/88 season. Other theatrical work includes Some Singing Blood at London's Royal Court Theatre, and an adaptation of Ibsen's The Lady from the Sea, presented in London and at the National Theatre of Norway in Oslo. Her play The House of Special Purpose was staged at the Chichester Festival Theatre in 2010.

Her screen adaptations include feature film I Capture the Castle (2003)  and the screenplay for a BBC television adaptation of Madame Bovary (2000). In 2007 she was the creator, writer and executive producer of BBC period drama Lilies. She wrote the screenplays for two major BBC adaptations of Elizabeth Gaskell's Cranford, and a film adaptation of the Noel Streatfeild novel Ballet Shoes.

In 2010 she was writer and executive producer of a major revival of the classic British television drama series Upstairs, Downstairs for the BBC. In 2011 she wrote and co-produced an adaptation of the Call the Midwife trilogy of books by Jennifer Worth. The series achieved record viewing figures for the channel. A second and third series aired in subsequent years. In February 2014 BBC announced that a 2014 Christmas Special and a fourth series had been commissioned. A fifth series was commissioned for 2016, shortly after series four was done filming. On 23 November 2016, the BBC announced a three-year deal with Neal Street Productions, commissioning a seventh, eighth and ninth series, all with Christmas specials. Having ordered series ten and eleven, and despite Covid-19 pandemic, the BBC announced in April 2020 that it had commissioned series 12 and 13, taking episodes into 2024.

In March 2008, she received the Best Writer award at the UK Royal Television Society awards for her work on Cranford. In April 2008 she received the Best Writer award at the UK Broadcasting Press Guild Awards for her work on Cranford, Ballet Shoes, and Lilies. She was nominated for two BAFTA TV Awards for Cranford as well as a Primetime Emmy. In November 2008 she received the Writers' Guild of Great Britain award for Best TV Series for Cranford. In 2011 she received a Primetime Emmy nomination for Upstairs Downstairs. In December 2012, the annual UK 'Women in Film and Television' awards presented her with the Technicolor Writing Award in recognition of her contribution to the industry.

A production of the musical Gigi was newly adapted by Thomas and ran at the Kennedy Center in January 2015, and then on Broadway, closing in June 2015.

In January 2019, Thomas was presented with the Outstanding Contribution to Writing Award by the Writers' Guild of Great Britain for her body of professional work. In December of that year, Thomas was a guest on BBC Radio 4's Desert Island Discs, selecting music by Joni Mitchell, The Beatles and Gabriel Fauré

In 2021, Thomas wrote the screenplay for Allelujah, a film adaptation of Alan Bennett's play Allelujah!, first staged by Nicholas Hytner at the Bridge Theatre in London. The film stars Jennifer Saunders, Bally Gill, Russell Tovey, David Bradley, Derek Jacobi, and Judi Dench and was directed by Richard Eyre. The film will be released in 2022.

Thomas is an honorary associate of the London Film School, and has honorary doctorates from the University of Liverpool and Edge Hill University.

Thomas was appointed Officer of the Order of the British Empire (OBE) in the 2022 Birthday Honours for services to drama.

Family
Thomas is married to actor Stephen McGann, who plays Dr Turner in Call the Midwife, with whom she has a son, Dominic.

Selected works

Film

 Allelujah, 2022

Television

 Madame Bovary, 2000, BBC One
 I Capture the Castle, 2003, BBC Films
 Lilies, 2007, BBC One
 Ballet Shoes, 2007, BBC One
 Cranford, 2007, BBC One
 Cranford Christmas Special, 2009, BBC One
 Upstairs Downstairs, 2010, BBC One
 Call the Midwife, 2012–present, BBC One
 Little Women, 2017 BBC One

Theatre
 All Flesh is Grass, 1984, National Youth Theatre
 Indigo, 1988, Royal Shakespeare Company and Almeida Theatre, London
 Shamrocks and Crocodiles, 1987, Liverpool Playhouse and National Theatre Studio
 Some Singing Blood, 1992, Royal Court Theatre
 The House of Special Purpose'', 2009, Chichester Festival Theatre

References

External links
 
 Q&A: Off Script - Heidi Thomas – Q&A from BBC website
 The Agency - Heidi Thomas Literary agent

1962 births
English screenwriters
English television writers
Living people
British women dramatists and playwrights
British women television writers
British women screenwriters
Writers from Liverpool
Alumni of the University of Liverpool
National Youth Theatre members
WFTV Award winners
McGann family
20th-century English dramatists and playwrights
20th-century English women writers
21st-century British dramatists and playwrights
21st-century English women writers
Officers of the Order of the British Empire
20th-century English screenwriters
21st-century British screenwriters